Moora is a townsite located 177 km north of Perth in the Wheatbelt region of Western Australia. Moora was one of the original stations on the Midland railway line to Walkaway, and the townsite was gazetted in 1895.

Commercial area
The town is the largest wheat belt town between Geraldton and Perth, and the third largest overall after the coastal settlements of Dongara and Jurien Bay. The town provides facilities and services such as commercial banks, schools, commerce and retail sectors, community recreational facilities; plus a Pharmacy, Dentist, Doctors and District Hospital.

The surrounding areas produce wheat and other cereal crops. The town is a receival site for Cooperative Bulk Handling.

Natural disasters
The town was left underwater in 1932 when heavy rainfall inundated the town, causing severe flooding. The town was left isolated as both rail lines and roads had portions washed away. Crops and stock in the surrounding area were also lost.

In March 1999, the town suffered a major flood when ex-Tropical Cyclone Elaine caused the Moore River to break its banks, with 1000 people evacuated. Just as the community was recovering, another major rainfall event on the already saturated land in May of the same year caused yet another flood in the town.

Education
Moora is home to the Central Midlands Senior High School, Moora Primary School and St Joseph's School (SJSM)—a Catholic private co-educational primary school.

Recreation
The Moora Agricultural Show is held every year in September, and includes a full Equestrian Program, Fire Works, a Fashion Parade, entertainment and exhibits. The Moora Cup Race Day is one of the biggest events on Moora's social calendar, and is held every year in October.

Many tourist attractions can be found around the Moora District, ranging from the Western Wildflower Farm to the abundance of hand-painted murals and the Moora Town Clock. As such, Moora is often a popular stopover for tourists en route to holiday destinations and those following the wildflower trail.

Nature
Moora lies within the Moora Important Bird Area, declared by BirdLife International because it supports up to 60 breeding pairs of the endangered Carnaby's Black Cockatoo.  Surrounding the town are several rural activities (such as the growing of wheat, barley, canola, oaten hay and lupins, as well as the raising of sheep, cattle and pigs) and a silica mine located 15 km north of the townsite.

Climate

Notable residents
Musician Paul Harding from electronic music group Pendulum attended Moora Primary School.

Gallery

References

External links

 Shire of Moora
 Moora Cemetery
 CMAS Moora Show

 
Towns in Western Australia
Wheatbelt (Western Australia)
Grain receival points of Western Australia